Shim Young-jip is a South Korean paralympic sport shooter. He participated at the 2020 Summer Paralympics in the shooting competition, being awarded the bronze medal in the men's 50 metre rifle 3 positions event. Young-jip also participated at the 2012 Summer Paralympics in the shooting competition, winning no medal.

References

External links 
Paralympic Games profile

Living people
Place of birth missing (living people)
Year of birth missing (living people)
South Korean male sport shooters
Paralympic shooters of South Korea
Paralympic bronze medalists for South Korea
Paralympic medalists in shooting
Shooters at the 2012 Summer Paralympics
Shooters at the 2020 Summer Paralympics
Medalists at the 2020 Summer Paralympics
21st-century South Korean people